Depressaria adustatella is a moth of the family Depressariidae. It is found in France and on the Iberian Peninsula and Sardinia. It is also present in North Africa, where it has been recorded from Morocco, Algeria and Libya.

References

Moths described in 1927
Depressaria
Moths of Europe
Moths of Africa